Kapawe'no 150B, historically known as Freeman 150B, is an Indian reserve of the Kapawe'no First Nation in Alberta, located within Big Lakes County. It is 8 kilometers northwest of Lesser Slave Lake.

References

Big Lakes County
Indian reserves in Alberta